The Design and Artists Copyright Society is a British private limited company. It is a rights management organisation which collects and distributes royalties to visual artists.

It was established in 1983 as the Design and Artists Copyright Society Limited and has distributed £100 million in royalties to visual artists and artists' estates. It retains a percentage of the royalties it collects and distributes. It represents 100,000 visual artists and artists' estates worldwide through an international network of collecting societies. It is a member of the Confédération Internationale des Sociétés d´Auteurs et Compositeurs.

References

External links

Copyright collection societies
1984 establishments in the United Kingdom
Non-profit organisations based in the United Kingdom
Organisations based in the London Borough of Tower Hamlets
Organizations established in 1984